The FIA Motorsport Games Touring Car Cup was the first FIA Motorsport Games Touring Car Cup, held at ACI Vallelunga Circuit, Italy on 1 November to 3 November 2019. The race was contested with TCR Touring Car spec cars.  The event was part of the 2019 FIA Motorsport Games.

Entry list

Results

Qualifying 1

Qualifying 2

Race 1

Race 2

Cup standings after the races

References

External links

Touring Car Cup
Touring car races